Pakistan has experimented with Daylight Saving Time (DST) a number of times since 2002, shifting local time from UTC+05:00 to UTC+06:00 during various summer periods.

 In 2002, DST was observed from the first Sunday in April (April 7) at 00:00 to the first Sunday in October (October 6) at 00:00. The government cabinet decided to do this "in order to make maximum use of daylight and to save energy."
 In 2008, DST began on June 1, and was initially set to run through August 31 to meet the annual shortfall of 4 gigawatts of electricity instead of enforcing daily power cuts in households and factories. The government later extended the end date to October 31, including the holy month of Ramadan (which began in early September). DST was originally meant to end on August 31, 2008
 In 2009, DST was observed from April 15 through October 31.

See also
Pakistan Standard Time
Time in Pakistan

References

Pakistan
Time in Pakistan